Primorsk may refer to:

 Dənizkənarı, Azerbaijan, formerly called Primorsk
 Primorsk, Leningrad Oblast, a town in Leningrad Oblast, Russia, formerly Koivisto or Björkö
 Primorsk, Kaliningrad Oblast, an urban-type settlement in Kaliningrad Oblast, Russia, formerly Fischhausen
 Primorsk, Krasnoyarsk Krai, a rural-type settlement in Krasnoyarsk Krai, Russia
 Primorsk, Volgograd Oblast, an urban-type settlement in Volgograd Oblast, Russia
 Prymorsk, a town in Zaporizhzhia Oblast, Ukraine

See also
 Primorsky (disambiguation)
 Primorye (inhabited locality)